The 1975 Segunda División Peruana, the second division of Peruvian football (soccer), was played by 6 teams. The tournament winner, Compañía Peruana de Teléfonos was promoted to the 1975 Copa Perú.

Results

Standings

References
 2da division 1975

Peruvian Segunda División seasons
Peru2
2